Joseph Thomas Wheeler (born 20 October 1987) is a New Zealand television presenter and former rugby union player. He played as a lock or flanker for Suntory Sungoliath in the Japanese Top League. Of Ngāi Tahu descent, Wheeler was selected in the New Zealand Māori All Blacks and represented them on the November 2013 tour of North America.

Rugby career
A product of the Marlborough Boys' College 1st XV, Wheeler made his Super Rugby debut for the  against the Sharks in 2010. He joined the Highlanders for the 2013 Super Rugby season on a two-year deal.

Television career
After retiring from playing rugby, Wheeler was hired by Sky Sport to commentate rugby.

In April 2021, Wheeler apologised after mimicking an Asian accent in an offensive way when talking about former teammate Kazuki Himeno during a post-match interview with another Highlanders player.

Personal life
Wheeler comes from a successful sporting family: his brother Ben Wheeler is a cricketer who plays for Central Districts; and his grandfather Ray Dowker was a multi-talented athlete who represented Canterbury in cricket, football and many other codes. 

Samuel Wheeler, his older brother, featured in several Marlborough social pub dart competitions and finished a career high 6th place (after a land slip denied other competitors the ability to attend).

In December 2015, Wheeler became engaged to his girlfriend of six years Courtney MacKay, one of the contestants from season 5 of The Block NZ. They married in 2017, and had a daughter in 2019.

References

External links 
Joe's website
Tasman profile
Highlanders profile
itsrugby.co.uk profile
Higlanders YouTube profile
Wheeler joins Highlanders
Highlanders in Tasman Coup 
Maori All Blacks Squad Named
Crusaders profile

1987 births
Crusaders (rugby union) players
Expatriate rugby union players in Japan
Highlanders (rugby union) players
Living people
Māori All Blacks players
New Zealand expatriate rugby union players
New Zealand expatriate sportspeople in Japan
New Zealand rugby union players
Ngāi Tahu people
People educated at Marlborough Boys' College
Rugby union flankers
Rugby union locks
Rugby union players from Christchurch
Tokyo Sungoliath players
Tasman rugby union players
New Zealand television presenters